is a professional Japanese baseball player. He plays outfielder for the Orix Buffaloes.

Sugimoto won the Japan Series Most Valuable Player Award for the 2022 Japan Series.

References

External links

1991 births
Living people
Baseball people from Tokushima Prefecture
Aoyama Gakuin University alumni
Japanese baseball players
Nippon Professional Baseball outfielders
Orix Buffaloes players